WAFS may refer to:

 Women's Auxiliary Ferrying Squadron
 Wide area file services, a recently coined term for distributed office functions
 WAFS (AM), a radio station (1190 AM) licensed to Atlanta, Georgia, United States